Questions of scientific atheism was an atheistic magazine published by the Institute of Scientific Atheism of the Central Committee from 1966 to 1989. Altogether 39 volumes were published.

History
The magazine was established in 1966. Its objectives were stated to be "the development of actual problems of the theory and practice of scientific atheism, analysis and generalization of scientific and atheistic education, criticism of the bourgeois-clerical reformist distortion position of religion in the socialist countries."

Some issues were topical.

Issue 17 (1975) was given a brief review in 1978 by Elya Pyatigorskaya in the journal Religion in Communist Lands.

Literature

References

1966 establishments in the Soviet Union
1989 disestablishments in the Soviet Union
Anti-religious campaign in the Soviet Union
Atheism publications
Biannual magazines
Magazines established in 1966
Magazines disestablished in 1989
Propaganda newspapers and magazines
Russian-language magazines
Magazines published in the Soviet Union